The 2015 Arctic Race of Norway was a four-stage cycling stage race that took place in Norway between 13 and 16 August. It was the third edition of the Arctic Race of Norway and is rated as a 2.HC event as part of the UCI Europe Tour. The race is the northernmost race in the 2015 men's cycling calendar. The champion of the 2014 edition was Steven Kruijswijk, though he was not present to defend his title.

The race was won by Rein Taaramäe on the final stage, ahead of Silvan Dillier and Ilnur Zakarin, after the three riders broke away from the pack on the finishing circuit. Alexander Kristoff won the first stage and the points classification, while the mountains classification was won by August Jensen (Team Coop-Øster Hus). BMC won the teams classification.

Race schedule

Teams 

22 teams were invited to take part in the race. Seven of these were UCI WorldTeams; 9 were UCI Professional Continental teams; five were UCI Continental teams. Each team entered six riders, so the peloton at the start of the race was made up of 126 riders.

Pre-race favourites 

The principal stage in the general classification was expected to be the third stage, the summit finish at Målselv. This stage was expected to favour the climbers, such as Rein Taaramäe, Louis Meintjes and Ilnur Zakarin, who were therefore the favourites for the overall victory. The other stages were expected to be won by sprinters. Two of the prominent sprinters in the race were the Norwegians Alexander Kristoff and Edvald Boasson Hagen. Other sprinters present included Sam Bennett, Bryan Coquard and Niccolò Bonifazio and Davide Cimolai (both ).

Stages

Stage 1 

13 August 2015 – Harstad to Harstad,

Stage 2 

14 August 2015 – Evenskjer to Setermoen,

Stage 3 

15 August 2015 – Senja to Målselv,

Stage 4 

16 August 2015 – Narvik to Narvik,

Classifications 

The race included four main classifications: the general classification, the points classification, the mountains classification and the youth classification. There was also an award for the most aggressive rider on each stage and a team classification.

References

Sources

Notes

External links 
 

Arctic Race of Norway
Arctic Race of Norway
Arctic Race of Norway